Thomas Beck was an English cricketer who played for Bedfordshire.

Beck made a single List A appearance for the side, during the 1970 season, against Buckinghamshire. From the tailend, he scored 0 not out. He bowled 6 overs in the match, conceding 23 runs.

References

English cricketers
Bedfordshire cricketers
Possibly living people
Year of birth missing